Wairimu is a name of Kikuyu origin that may refer to:
Wairimu Kiambuthi, Kenyan academic and film director
Stellah Wairimu Bosire-Otieno (born 1986), Kenyan physician and corporate executive
Alice Wairimu Nderitu, Kenyan educator and author
Brenda Wairimu (born 1989), Kenyan actress and model
Jane Wairimu (born 1985), Kenyan female volleyball player

Kenyan names